Sceloporus lundelli, Lundell's spiny lizard, is a species of lizard in the family Phrynosomatidae. It is found in Mexico and Belize.

References

Sceloporus
Reptiles of Mexico
Reptiles of Belize
Reptiles described in 1939
Taxa named by Hobart Muir Smith